George Brant Bridgman  (November 5, 1864 – December 16, 1943) was a Canadian-American painter, writer, and teacher in the fields of anatomy and figure drawing. Bridgman taught anatomy for artists at the Art Students League of New York for some 45 years.

Life and work
Bridgman was born in 1864 in the United Province of Canada. In his youth, Bridgman studied the arts under painter and sculptor Jean-Léon Gérôme at the École des Beaux-Arts in Paris, and later with Gustave Boulanger. For most of his life Bridgman lived in the United States where he taught anatomy and figure drawing at the Art Students League of New York (from 1898 until 1900, and then 1903 until October 1943). His successor at Art Students League was Robert Beverly Hale. Bridgman had also taught classes at the Grand Central School of Art and at the American Bank Note Company.

Bridgman used box forms to represent the major masses of the figure (head, thorax, and pelvis) which he would tie together with gestural lines and produce to create "wedges" or simplified interconnecting forms of the body.

He had been a member of the Royal Canadian Academy of Arts.

Notable students
Among his many thousands of students was Norman Rockwell; in his autobiography, My Adventures as an Illustrator (1960), Rockwell spoke highly of Bridgman. Roughly 70,000 students studied with Bridgman in his many years teaching, notable artists include: McClelland Barclay, Emily Newton Barto, C. C. Beall, Gifford Beal, Elizabeth Cady Stanton Blake, Rosina Cox Boardman, Bessie Callender, Dane Chanase, Richard V. Culter, Chon Day, Joseph Delaney, Elsie Driggs, Eyre de Lanux,  Helen Winslow Durkee, Will Eisner, Edward McNeil Farmer, Elias Goldberg, Marion Greenwood, Robert Beverly Hale, Lorenzo Homar, Clark Hulings, Louis Paul Jonas, Jack Kamen, Deane Keller, Lee Krasner, Richard Lahey, Andrew Loomis, Anita Malfatti, Paul Manship, Frank McCarthy, Earl Moran, John Cullen Murphy, Kimon Nicolaïdes, Corrado Parducci, Norman Raeben, Frank J. Reilly, Joseph Emile Renier,  Ulysses Ricci, Ernie Schroeder, Archie Boyd Teater, Allie Tennant, John Vassos, Franklin Brooke Voss, Edmund Ward, Mahonri Young, and William Zorach.

Jackson Pollock's sketchpad features work from Bridgman's books.

Death and legacy 
Bridgman died on December 16, 1943, in New Rochelle, New York, after suffering from an illness for a year. He was survived by his wife, Helene Leonora Bridgman (née Rupperstberg) and their three children.

George Bridgman has 100 drawings in the public collection at the Norman Rockwell Museum.

Bibliography 
 
 
 
 
 
 
 
 

Many of Bridgman's books are available as reprints by Dover Publications.

References

External links

Drawings from George Bridgman's 1911 Art Class
Art Students League of New York

19th-century American painters
American male painters
20th-century American painters
American autobiographers
American instructional writers
American alumni of the École des Beaux-Arts
Members of the Royal Canadian Academy of Arts
1865 births
1943 deaths
American art educators
Art Students League of New York faculty
19th-century American male artists
20th-century American male artists